116th Street may refer to:

Streets 
 116th Street (Manhattan), a street in the New York City borough of Manhattan

Stations 
 116th Street (IRT Lexington Avenue Line)
 116th Street (IND Eighth Avenue Line)
 116th Street (Second Avenue Subway)
 116th Street (IRT Lenox Avenue Line)
 116th Street (IRT Third Avenue Line)
 116th Street (IRT Ninth Avenue Line)
 116th Street–Columbia University (IRT Broadway–Seventh Avenue Line)
 Rockaway Park–Beach 116th Street (IND Rockaway Line); a station in New York City, in the borough of Queens

Other 
 116th Street Crew, a crew in the Genovese crime family of the New York Mob from the 1960s